Charles Wagenheim (February 21, 1896 – March 6, 1979) was an American actor who appeared in over 250 films.
  
On television, Wagenheim appeared in an episode of Barnaby Jones titled "The Murdering Class", portraying a cemetery groundskeeper (named Charles Waggenheim).  

Wagenheim died on March 6, 1979, from blunt force trauma caused by his caregiver, Stephanie Boone.

Wagenheim had thought that Miss Boone had been stealing from him and forging checks. When he confronted her in his apartment over this, an argument ensued and she struck him on the head, causing his death. An autopsy found that Wagenheim had died by way of blunt force trauma.

Boone was charged with the murder of Wagenheim and pleaded guilty to voluntary manslaughter. She was sentenced to serve eight years for his death.

He also appeared in 1966 as Dodge Townsman “Halligan” in S12E2’s “Goldtakers” & in S12E5’s “The Good People” on the TV Western Series Gunsmoke.

Filmography

References

External links
 

1896 births
1979 deaths
Male actors from Newark, New Jersey
American male film actors
American male television actors
American murder victims
Male murder victims
People murdered in California
Deaths from head injury
deaths by beating in the United States
1979 murders in the United States
20th-century American male actors
Western (genre) television actors